Victoria M. Siradze was a Georgian politician. 

She was appointed Deputy Premier in 1962.

References

20th-century women politicians from Georgia (country)
20th-century politicians from Georgia (country)